Adolphus Fitzgerald Washington, Jr. (born November 24, 1994) is a former American football defensive tackle. He played college football at Ohio State and was drafted by the Buffalo Bills in the third round of the 2016 NFL Draft.

Early years
Washington attended Roger Bacon High School in St. Bernard, Ohio as a freshman, before transferring to Robert A. Taft Information Technology High School in Cincinnati, Ohio for his final three years. He had 90 tackles and 23.5 sacks as a senior and 107 tackles and 19 sacks as a junior. Washington was a five-star recruit. He committed to Ohio State University to play college football. Washington also played basketball in high school. As a senior, he averaged 23.1 points and 14.3 rebounds per game and was named the Gatorade Basketball Player of the Year for Ohio. Washington was named a Parade Magazine All-American in both football and basketball.

College career
As a freshman in 2012, Washington played in 10 games. He recorded nine tackles and three sacks. As a sophomore in 2013, he played in 12 games with five starts and recorded 36 tackles and two sacks. As a junior in 2014, he started all 14 games, recording 48 tackles and 4.5 sacks. During the 2015 College Football Playoff National Championship against Oregon, he had three tackles and a sack. On December 9, 2015, Washington was cited for solicitation. As a result, he was suspended for the Fiesta Bowl.

College statistics

Professional career

Buffalo Bills
Washington was drafted by the Buffalo Bills in the third round, 80th overall, in the 2016 NFL Draft. He played in 15 games with 11 starts his rookie season, recording 21 tackles and 2.5 sacks. The following year in 2017, he started 10 games out of 15 played, recording 33 tackles and one sack.

After just one game in 2018, the Bills released him on September 10, 2018. Washington finished his time on the Bills with 3.5 sacks and 56 tackles.

Dallas Cowboys
On September 18, 2018, Washington was signed to the Dallas Cowboys' practice squad.

Cincinnati Bengals
On September 26, 2018, Washington was signed by the Cincinnati Bengals off the Cowboys' practice squad. He was placed on injured reserve on November 23, 2018 after suffering a knee injury in Week 9. On April 23, 2019, the Bengals waived Washington.

Miami Dolphins
On May 23, 2019, Washington was signed by the Miami Dolphins. He was waived on September 1, 2019.

Personal life
On July 9, 2017, Washington was arrested for a misdemeanor weapons charge in Sharonville, Ohio. On August 28, 2017, he was acquitted of weapons charges.

References

External links
Ohio State Buckeyes bio

1994 births
Living people
Players of American football from Cincinnati
African-American players of American football
American football defensive tackles
American football defensive ends
Parade High School All-Americans (boys' basketball)
Ohio State Buckeyes football players
Buffalo Bills players
Dallas Cowboys players
Cincinnati Bengals players
Miami Dolphins players
21st-century African-American sportspeople